The Belgian minehunter Primula (M924) is a  of the Belgian Naval Component, launched on 20 December 1990 at the Mercantile-Belyard shipyard in Rupelmonde and christened by Mrs. Adriaensens, the wife of the then Mayor of Willebroek, on 12 June 1991. The patronage of Primula was accepted by the city of Willebroek. It was the tenth and last of the Belgian Tripartite-class minehunters.

She underwent major modernization works in 2004-2005, such as the replacement of the PAP-minehunting system and 20mm-gun.

References

External links
Section of the website of the Belgian Ministry of Defence about the M924 Primula

Tripartite-class minehunters of the Belgian Navy
Ships built in Belgium
Ships built in France
Ships built in the Netherlands
1990 ships
Minehunters of Belgium